The FIS Nordic World Ski Championships 1985 took place January 16–27, 1985 in Seefeld, Austria (near Innsbruck). This was the fourth time the Innsbruck area hosted these championships, having done so in 1933, the 1964 Winter Olympics, and the 1976 Winter Olympics. Both the Gundersen method and freestyle skiing for the cross-country skiing portion of the event were introduced in both Nordic combined events (individual and 3 × 10 km relay).

Men's cross-country

15 km 
January 22, 1985

30 km 
January 18, 1985

50 km 
January 27, 1985

4 × 10 km relay
January 24, 1985

Women's cross-country

5 km 
January 21, 1985

10 km 
January 19, 1985

20 km 
January 26, 1985

4 × 5 km relay
January 22, 1985

Men's Nordic combined

15 km Individual Gundersen
January 18, 1985

3 × 10 km team
January 25, 1985

Men's ski jumping

Individual normal hill 
January 26, 1985

Individual large hill 
January 20, 1985

Team large hill
January 22, 1985

Medal table
Medal winners by nation.

References
FIS 1985 Cross country results
FIS 1985 Nordic combined results
FIS 1985 Ski jumping results
Results from German Wikipedia

External links 
 The “Olympic” History - Entry on the history of winter games in Seefeld on seefeld.com 
 Historic TV coverage of the Nordic World Ski Championships 1985 on YouTube

FIS Nordic World Ski Championships
1985 in Nordic combined
Sport in Tyrol (state)
1985 in Austrian sport
January 1985 sports events in Europe
Nordic skiing competitions in Austria
February 1985 sports events in Europe